Sweat equity is a non-monetary benefit that a company's stakeholders give in labour and time, rather than a monetary contribution, that benefit the company. Sweat equity is rewarded in the form of sweat equity shares. These are shares given out by a company in exchange for labour and time rather than a monetary amount.

Sweat equity in real estate 

Sweat equity has an application in business real estate, for example, where the owners put in effort and toil to build the business, in real estate where owners can perform D.I.Y. improvements and increase the value of the real estate, and in other areas such as an auto owner putting in their own effort and toil to increase the value of the vehicle.
 
The term sweat equity explains the fact that value added to someone's own house by unpaid work results in measurable market rate value increase in house price. The more labor applied to the home, and the greater the resultant increase in value, the more sweat equity has been used. The concept of sweat equity was first employed in the United States by the American Friends Service Committee in the Penn Craft self-help housing project beginning in 1937. The AFSC began using the term in the 1950s when helping migrant farmers in California to build their own homes. It is perhaps most popularly associated today with a successful model used by Habitat for Humanity, in which families who would otherwise be unable to purchase a home contribute sweat equity hours to the construction of their own home or the homes of other Habitat for Humanity partner families, or by volunteering to assist the organization in other ways. Once living in their new home, the family then make interest-free mortgage payments into a revolving fund which then provides capital to build homes for other families.

Sweat equity in U.S. private business 

Private businesses in the U.S. make up 60% of yearly business net income. Recent data has shown the sweat equity in the private business sector equals 1.2 times the U.S. GDP. Theories have been put out to the public to say that lowering income tax rates on private businesses is significantly understated when considering smaller firms' sweat equity effects.

Sweat equity shares 

Sweat equity shares are discounted shares issued by a company to its employees or directors. The shares are given in exchange for a value-add by an employee or director. Sweat equity shares are essential when creating a startup with low amounts of funding.

Sweat equity shares can be used as motivation for the startup's employees and will create a more level playing field against large corporations. In a startup company formed as a corporation, employees may receive stock or stock options, becoming part-owners of the firm, in exchange for accepting salaries that are below their respective market values (this includes zero wages). The term used to refer to a form of compensation by businesses to their owners or employees.

The term is sometimes used to describe the efforts put into a start-up company by the founders in exchange for ownership shares of the company. This concept, also called "stock for services" and sometimes "equity compensation" or "sweat equity,"  can also be seen when startup companies use their shares of stock to entice service providers to provide necessary corporate services in exchange for a discount or for deferring service fees until a later date; see, e.g., "Idea Makers and Idea Brokers in High Technology Entrepreneurship" by Todd L. Juneau et al., Greenwood Press, 2003, which describes equity for service programs involving patent lawyers and securities lawyers who specialize in start-up companies as clients. The “Slicing Pie” model, outlined in Mike Moyer's 2012 book Slicing Pie: Funding Your Company Without Funds, outlines a formula based entirely on sweat equity by observing the relative value of each person's unpaid fair market compensation and reimbursement.

Valuing sweat equity 

There are many ways to value sweat equity. A Venture Capital way of measuring sweat equity is to look at the entrepreneur's initial cash investment plus anything personally guaranteed and allocate 20% of that as sweat equity. Venture capitalists will also consider what industry you are in and how much growth potential there is. Although VCs have their way of sorting out the sweat equity brought into a company, it is essential to note that this world is not perfect. There are no ways to measure one's sweat equity. A few things should be brought up when giving sweat equity, and that's the importance of keeping people happy and not losing relationships. Sometimes splitting up equity in a business is vital to continuing it, and sweat equity should be considered. Think about the work the employer or partner put in, not only the cash value put up.

Risks 
The risks of sweat equity come with larger rewards. For instance, a person who is willing to take less pay in exchange for stock options or ownership in the company can later make more money. This obviously comes with higher risks because the company may not be as profitable yet to pay you the money that comes of it. Nevertheless, an entrepreneur/founder can use this as an advantage to incentivize their employees or incoming hires that may be getting offers from larger companies.

See also 
 To each according to his contribution

References

Further reading

Corporate finance
Habitat for Humanity
Entrepreneurship